Marco Soffiatti Grael (born 9 June 1989) is a Brazilian sailor. He competes in the 49er class alongside Gabriel Borges, finishing 11th at the 2016 Summer Olympics, 16th in the 2020 Summer Olympics. Both also won the gold at the 2019 Pan American Games. He is the son of Olympic champion Torben Grael, and brother of Martine Grael.

Notes

References

External links

1989 births
Living people
Brazilian male sailors (sport)
Olympic sailors of Brazil
Sailors at the 2016 Summer Olympics – 49er
Sailors at the 2020 Summer Olympics – 49er
Pan American Games medalists in sailing
Pan American Games gold medalists for Brazil
Sailors at the 2019 Pan American Games
Medalists at the 2019 Pan American Games
Extreme Sailing Series sailors
Marco Grael
Sportspeople from Rio de Janeiro (city)